Parliamentary elections were held in Iran on 9 July 1971. The result was a victory for the New Iran Party, which won 230 of the 268 seats in the Majlis and 28 of the 30 elected seats in the Senate. Voter turnout was around 35%. The elections were boycotted by the Pan-Iranist Party, which complained that the government held a monopoly over campaign broadcasts on state radio and television, and also claimed that its newspaper had been censored. Its offshoot, Iranians' Party, won a seat by its secretary-general.

Following the elections, Prime Minister Amir-Abbas Hoveyda formed a new government on 13 September.

The elections were "rigged and far from a legitimate process".

Results

Majlis

Senate

See also 
 1974 Shahsavar by-election

References

1971 elections in Asia
1971 elections in Iran
Iranian Senate elections
National Consultative Assembly elections
Lower house elections in Iran